The Alderman School District #78 in Valley City, North Dakota was built in 1925–26.

It has also been known as the Ashtabula Township Hall, as Barnes County Polling Precinct #10, as Ashtabula Lakers 4-H Clubhouse, and as 32 BA-0159;.  It was listed on the National Register of Historic Places (NRHP) in 2013.

It served as a one-room rural school during 1928–1959. It is well preserved and "embodies in its architectural details many regulations that reflected current best practices for rural education, such as best natural lighting, best heating and ventilation, blackboards, and best sanitation practices of the time."

During 1959–2004, it served as the Ashtabula Township Hall.

References 

School buildings on the National Register of Historic Places in North Dakota
School buildings completed in 1925
Schools in Barnes County, North Dakota
National Register of Historic Places in Barnes County, North Dakota
1925 establishments in North Dakota
City and town halls on the National Register of Historic Places in North Dakota
4-H
One-room schoolhouses in North Dakota